Katherine Wynter (born 9 February 1996) is a Jamaican badminton player. In 2016, she won the Jamaica International tournament in the women's doubles event partnered with Ruth Williams. She also won the bronze medal at the 2016 Pan Am Badminton Championships in the mixed doubles event partnered with Dennis Coke. She competed at the 2018 Commonwealth Games in Gold Coast.

Wynter educated at the University of the West Indies in Mona, and was awarded University Sportswoman of the Year in 2015 and 2016.

Achievements

Pan Am Championships 
Mixed doubles

BWF International Challenge/Series 
Women's doubles

Mixed doubles

  BWF International Challenge tournament
  BWF International Series tournament
  BWF Future Series tournament

References

External links 
 

1996 births
Living people
Sportspeople from Kingston, Jamaica
Jamaican female badminton players
Badminton players at the 2018 Commonwealth Games
Badminton players at the 2022 Commonwealth Games
Commonwealth Games competitors for Jamaica
Badminton players at the 2011 Pan American Games
Badminton players at the 2015 Pan American Games
Badminton players at the 2019 Pan American Games
Pan American Games competitors for Jamaica
Competitors at the 2014 Central American and Caribbean Games
Competitors at the 2018 Central American and Caribbean Games